is a Japanese voice actress. She is well known for her alias, Fūri Samoto, for which she uses primarily for visual novels.

Anime
Fushigiboshi no Futagohime - Soma (ep 31)
Happiness! - Jun Watarase
Nanatsuiro Drops - Sumomo Akihime
Koihime Musō - Daikyō, Shōkyō
Shin Koihime Musō - Chinkyū Kōdai / Nenene
Blessing of the Campanella - Nina Lindberg
The Sacred Blacksmith - Patty Baldwin
Fate/stay night - Kaede Makidera (TV) 
Mashiro-Iro Symphony - The color of lovers (TV) - Yuiko Amaha (eps 9, 11–12)
Shuffle! (TV) as schoolgirl A (ep 6)

Games
Heart de Roommate - Marumu Ogamayama

External links
 Michiru Yuimoto's personal site 
 
 
 

Japanese voice actresses
Year of birth missing (living people)
Living people